Juglandinae is a subtribe of the Juglandeae tribe, of the Juglandoideae subfamily, in the Juglandaceae family. Walnut tree species make up the genus Juglans, which belongs to the subtribe Juglandinae.

Genera and species

References

 
Juglandeae
Plant subtribes